Samsaram is a 1975 Indian Telugu-language drama film, produced and directed by T. Prakash Rao under the Anil Productions banner. It stars N. T. Rama Rao and Jamuna. The music was composed by T. Chalapathi Rao.

Plot
The film begins with an ideal couple Raghava Rao & Lalitha who are blessed with two children Shekar & Lakshmi. Since they have knitted without the approval of Lalitha’s father advocate Pratap Rao, he hostiles them. Parallelly, Raghava works in a firm owned by a tycoon Bhupati where he unfolds the swindle committed by his brother-in-law General Manager Satyam. Discerning it, Bhupathi switches Raghava Rao as a substitute for Satyam which begrudges him. Therefrom, Raghava Rao is compelled to alcohol intake at the parties which leads to conflicts in his family. 

Meanwhile, Satyam maintains an affair with secretary Nalini who is endeared by her illiterate cousin Chandram and she belittles him. As of now, Nalini conceives and pressurizes Satyam to knit her. Hence, he slays her and incriminates Raghava Rao. Though Chandram witnesses it, he is feeble as dumb. Anyhow, Lingam catches a photograph of the crime and clutches Satyam. Currently, Pratap Rao sentences life to Raghava Rao. Plus, Lalitha that affirms her husband as a convict quits the town and joins as a tutor at a college whose principal Raja Rao nurtures her as her sister. 

Years roll by, and Raghava Rao acquits, being unbeknownst joins as a gardener at Raja Rao’s residence and spots Lalitha. Anyhow, he hides his identity until he proves his innocence. Besides, Shekar loves Raja Rao’s daughter Saroja and Lakshmi with Bhupathi's son Gopi. Once Raghava Rao meets his jail-mate Dara sidekick of Satyam where he comes across Chandram nourished by him. Parallelly, Bhupathi gazes at the defraud of Satyam & Lingam, so, they ruse to slaughter him. Wherefore Satyam moves to Dara when he recognizes Chandram and gets him knockdown. Before dying, he retrieves his voice and reveals the actuality to Raghava Rao. At last, Raghava Rao in disguise as Singapore Rowdy Bhakra triumphs in ceasing Bhupati. Finally, the movie ends on a happy note with the reunion of the entire family.

Cast

N. T. Rama Rao as Raghava Rao
Jamuna as Lalitha
Jaggayya as Bhupathi
Satyanarayana as Satyam
Prabhakar Reddy as Dara
Mikkilineni as Lawyer Pratap Rao
Padmanabham 
Allu Ramalingaiah as Lingam
Mada
Raavi Kondala Rao as Raja Rao
P. J. Sarma
Chitti Babu as Gopi 
K. K. Sarma
Jayasudha as Saroja
Rojaramani as Lakshmi
Jaya Malini as item number
Pushpa Kumari 
Vijaya Bhanu as Nalini
Jhansi

Soundtrack

Music composed by T. Chalapathi Rao. Music released by Polydor Records Company.

References

Indian drama films
Films directed by T. Prakash Rao
Films scored by T. Chalapathi Rao